A referendum concerning the establishment of the French Empire was held in France in November 1804. The officially announced result showed a nearly unanimous French electorate approving the change in Napoleon Bonaparte's status from First Consul to Emperor of the French.  About seven million voters were called to participate, of which 47.2% did.

Results

References

1804 in France
Referendums in France
1804 referendums
Napoleon
Constitutional referendums in France
November 1804 events